Enchelycore is a genus of moray eels in the family Muraenidae. Members of the genus feature distinctive, curved jaws that prevent them from fully closing their mouth and aids them in catching, and holding on to prey. Enchelycore species can also feature extremely bright colors (E. pardalis, E. anatina) and ornate markings (E. lichenosa).

Species
There are currently 13 recognized species in this genus:
 Enchelycore anatina (R. T. Lowe, 1838) (Fangtooth moray)
 Enchelycore bayeri (L. P. Schultz, 1953) (Bayer's moray)
 Enchelycore bikiniensis (L. P. Schultz, 1953) (Bikini Atoll moray)
 Enchelycore carychroa J. E. Böhlke & E. B. Böhlke, 1976 (Caribbean chestnut moray)
 Enchelycore kamara J. E. Böhlke & E. B. Böhlke, 1980 (Dark-spotted moray)
 Enchelycore lichenosa (D. S. Jordan & Snyder, 1901) (Reticulate hookjaw moray)
 Enchelycore nigricans (Bonnaterre, 1788) (Mulatto Conger)
 Enchelycore nycturanus D. G. Smith, 2002
 Enchelycore octaviana (G. S. Myers & Wade, 1941) (Slenderjaw moray)
 Enchelycore pardalis (Temminck & Schlegel, 1846) (Leopard moray)
 Enchelycore ramosa (Griffin, 1926) (Mosaic moray)
 Enchelycore schismatorhynchus (Bleeker, 1853) (White-margined moray)
 Enchelycore tamarae Prokofiev, 2005

References

 
Muraenidae
Taxa named by Johann Reinhold Forster
Marine fish genera